Methanosphaera stadtmaniae is a methanogen archaeon. It is a non-motile, Gram-positive, spherical-shaped organism that obtains energy by using hydrogen to reduce methanol to methane. It does not possess cytochromes and is part of the large intestine's biota.

This species is often referred to as Methanosphaera stadtmanae, apparently erroneously.

References

Further reading

External links 

Type strain of Methanosphaera stadtmanae at BacDive -  the Bacterial Diversity Metadatabase

Euryarchaeota
Archaea described in 1985